Malcolmia maritima, also known by its common name Virginia stock, is a popular annual garden plant from the family Brassicaceae. A beautiful and profusely flowering annual, it is probably one of the easiest of all plants to grow. It is native in Greece and Albania and may be naturalized elsewhere in Mediterranean Europe where it occurs in maritime sandy habitats and in waste places.

Cultivation
For best results in growing Virginia stock, sow on the surface in patches or rows and thin the young plants to 6 inches apart. It prefers full to partial sun and well drained soils.

Varieties
There is a fair amount of variation in cultivated material, particularly with regard to stature and flower colour (variously violet, purple, lavender, pink).

References

External links
USDA on Virginia Stock

Brassicaceae
Garden plants
Flora of Lebanon
Plants described in 1755